The Pickaquoy Centre is a multi-use leisure centre in Kirkwall, Orkney, Scotland.  The arena has 1,600-seat stands, and can be condensed and used as a sports hall, with room for two five a side football pitches. The football pitches host Orkney F.C. of the North Caledonian Football League and also the Orkney official football team. It also has a 247-seat cinema, numerous meeting rooms, health spa, gym, indoor and outdoor children's play areas, a café and bar. Outside, there is an All Weather Pitch, used for football and hockey, several grass pitches used for football and rugby and an athletics track. The centre also has a campsite within its grounds.

External links
 Official website

Football venues in Scotland
Sports venues in Orkney
Sports venues completed in 1999
Cinemas in Scotland
1999 establishments in Scotland
Kirkwall